Chichester Clotworthy Skeffington, 4th Earl of Massereene (1746–25 February 1816) was an Anglo-Irish politician and peer.

Massereene was the youngest son of Clotworthy Skeffington, 1st Earl of Massereene and Anne Eyre. He was educated at Trinity College Dublin.

He sat in Irish House of Commons as the Member of Parliament for Antrim Borough between 1768 and 1797. He held the office of High Sheriff of Antrim in 1797. On 12 June 1811 he succeeded his brother as Earl of Massereene.

Massereene married Lady Harriet Jocelyn, daughter of Robert Jocelyn, 1st Earl of Roden and Lady Anne Hamilton, in 1780. They had one daughter, Harriet, who succeeded to her father's viscountcy on his death. The earldom, which could only pass down the male line, become extinct.

References

|-

1746 births
1816 deaths
Alumni of Trinity College Dublin
18th-century Anglo-Irish people
High Sheriffs of Antrim
Irish MPs 1769–1776
Irish MPs 1776–1783
Irish MPs 1783–1790
Irish MPs 1790–1797
Earls of Massereene